Australomimetus is a genus of spiders in the family Mimetidae. It was first described in 1986 by Heimer. , it contains 31 species.

Species
Australomimetus comprises the following species:
Australomimetus annulipes Heimer, 1986
Australomimetus audax (Hickman, 1929)
Australomimetus aurioculatus (Hickman, 1929)
Australomimetus burnetti Heimer, 1986
Australomimetus catulli (Heimer, 1989)
Australomimetus childersiensis Heimer, 1986
Australomimetus daviesianus Heimer, 1986
Australomimetus diabolicus Harms & Harvey, 2009
Australomimetus djuka Harms & Harvey, 2009
Australomimetus dunlopi Harms & Harvey, 2009
Australomimetus hannemanni (Heimer, 1989)
Australomimetus hartleyensis Heimer, 1986
Australomimetus hertelianus Heimer, 1986
Australomimetus hirsutus Heimer, 1986
Australomimetus japonicus (Uyemura, 1938)
Australomimetus kioloensis Heimer, 1986
Australomimetus maculosus (Rainbow, 1904)
Australomimetus mendax Harms & Harvey, 2009
Australomimetus mendicus (O. Pickard-Cambridge, 1880)
Australomimetus miniatus Heimer, 1986
Australomimetus nasoi Harms & Harvey, 2009
Australomimetus pseudomaculosus Heimer, 1986
Australomimetus raveni Heimer, 1986
Australomimetus robustus Heimer, 1986
Australomimetus sennio (Urquhart, 1891)
Australomimetus spinosus Heimer, 1986
Australomimetus stephanieae Harms & Harvey, 2009
Australomimetus subspinosus Heimer, 1986
Australomimetus sydneyensis Heimer, 1986
Australomimetus tasmaniensis (Hickman, 1928)
Australomimetus triangulosus Heimer, 1986

References

Mimetidae
Araneomorphae genera
Spiders of Australia
Spiders of New Zealand
Spiders of Asia